FTSE Russell is a subsidiary of London Stock Exchange Group (LSEG) that produces, maintains, licenses, and markets stock market indices. The division is notable for FTSE 100 Index, Russell 2000 Index, among other indices.

The brand and division FTSE Russell was introduced in 2015, while integrating the indexing services of FTSE index series and Russell index series. In the same year, LSEG sold Frank Russell Company's asset management division Russell Investments. Also in 2015, FTSE Russell acquired the corporate data company Mergent. 

In December 2020, FTSE Russell announced that it would strip its indexes of eight Chinese companies in response to U.S. Executive Order 13959.

Indexes

 FTSE 350 Index
 FTSE All-Share Index
 FTSE SmallCap Index
 FTSE4Good Index
 FTSE AIM UK 50 Index
 FTSE AIM 100 Index
 FTSE AIM All-Share Index
 FTSE MIB

Russell Indexes
Russell 3000 Index
Russell 2500 Index
Russell 2000 Index
Russell 1000 Index
Russell Top 200 Index
Russell Top 50 Index
Russell Midcap Index
Russell Microcap Index
Russell Small Cap Completeness Index

References

External links

London Stock Exchange Group